The mimic blenny or piano fangblenny, Plagiotremus tapeinosoma, is a blenny of the genus Plagiotremus, with a widespread Indo-Pacific distribution including New Zealand from depths of .  This species reaches a length of  TL.

References
 
 Tony Ayling & Geoffrey Cox, Collins Guide to the Sea Fishes of New Zealand,  (William Collins Publishers Ltd, Auckland, New Zealand 1982)

External links
 

Mimic blenny
Fish described in 1857